The Last Starfighter is a 1984 American space opera film directed by Nick Castle. The film tells the story of Alex Rogan (Lance Guest), a teenager recruited by an alien defense force to fight in an interstellar war. It also features Robert Preston, Dan O'Herlihy, Catherine Mary Stewart, Norman Snow, and Kay E. Kuter.

The Last Starfighter, along with Disney's Tron, has the distinction of being one of cinema's earliest films to use extensive "real-life" computer-generated imagery (CGI) to depict its many starships, environments and battle scenes.

The Last Starfighter was Robert Preston's final role in a theatrical film. The character of Centauri, a "lovable con-man", was written with him in mind and was a nod to his most famous role as Professor Harold Hill in The Music Man.

There was a subsequent novelization of the film by Alan Dean Foster, as well as a video game based on the production. In 2004, it was also adapted as an off-Broadway musical.

Plot 

Alex Rogan is a teenager living in a trailer park with his mother and younger brother, Louis. After being rejected for a scholarship, Alex becomes angry at his go-nowhere existence. The only entertainment in the trailer park comes from an arcade game called "Starfighter", in which the player defends "the Frontier" against Xur and the Ko-Dan Armada in a space battle. After Alex becomes the game's highest-scoring player, he is approached by the game's inventor, Centauri, who invites him to take a ride in his fancy car as a prize for winning the game. Centauri is actually an alien and his car a spacecraft; Alex is essentially abducted, and Beta, a doppelgänger android, is used to cover Alex's absence.

Alex learns that the Starfighter arcade game represents a real-life conflict between the Rylan Star League and the Ko-Dan Empire; the latter is led by Xur, a native Rylan traitor and son of Ambassador Enduran, the Starfighter commander, to whom the Ko-Dan Emperor has promised control of Rylos. Starfighter is, in fact, an elaborate recruiting tool, designed as a test to find those "with the gift" (Centauri is actually criticized in one scene for placing the game on Earth, as humans were not considered capable of becoming Starfighters).  Alex, expected to be the gunner for a Starfighter spacecraft called the Gunstar, is partnered with a reptilian pilot named Grig. He also learns that the Frontier is a forcefield protecting Rylos and its surrounding planets from invasion; Xur has given the Ko-Dan the means to breach it.

Xur reveals he has discovered an infiltrator in his ranks and broadcasts the spy's execution to the Star League. He then proclaims that once Rylos' moon is in eclipse, the Ko-Dan Armada will begin their invasion. Unnerved by everything he has seen, Alex asks to be taken home. On Earth, Centauri tells Alex to contact him should he change his mind. Meanwhile, a saboteur eliminates the Starfighter base defenses and thus enables the Ko-Dan to attack the base, causing heavy damage, killing the Starfighters and destroying the Gunstars. Only Grig and an advanced prototype Gunstar survive.

Alex discovers Beta and contacts Centauri to retrieve him. Centauri arrives just as Alex and Beta are attacked by an alien assassin, a Zando-Zan, in Xur's service; Centauri shoots off its right arm. He then explains that more Zando-Zan will be coming to Earth, and the only way for Alex to protect his family (and Earth) is to embrace his ability as a Starfighter. Before Alex can reply, the assassin attempts to shoot Alex. Centauri jumps in the way, taking the hit and killing the alien. Alex and Centauri fly back to the Starfighter base, where Centauri succumbs to his injuries. Alex finds Grig, and they prepare the Gunstar to battle the Ko-Dan Armada.

While Grig trains Alex, Beta finds it difficult to maintain his impersonation, particularly with Maggie Gordon, Alex's girlfriend. After discovering that a group of Zando-Zan have set up a communication center from their spaceship outside the trailer park, Beta reveals everything to Maggie. She does not believe him until the Zando-Zan discover the pair and Beta is shot, exposing damaged circuitry. They steal a friend's pickup truck and charge it at the Zando-Zan ship; Beta has Maggie jump out before sacrificing himself by crashing into the ship, destroying it.

Alex and Grig attack the Ko-Dan mothership, crippling its communications. Once Alex's weapons are depleted, he desperately activates a secret weapon on the Gunstar, the "Death Blossom", that destroys the remaining Ko-Dan fighters. With the fleet destroyed, Lord Kril orders Xur executed for his arrogance and failure to ensure victory, but Xur escapes the mothership just before Alex cripples its guidance controls, causing it to crash into Rylos' moon.

Alex is proclaimed the savior of Rylos and invited to help rebuild the Star League by Enduran, as it is still vulnerable: the Frontier has collapsed and Xur escaped. An unknown alien approaches, revealing himself as Centauri and explaining he was in a healing stasis. Alex agrees to stay, but he returns to Earth, landing his ship in the trailer park. Grig tells Alex's mother and the people of the trailer park of Alex's heroism; Alex asks Maggie to come with him, and she agrees. Louis is inspired to join Alex and begins playing the Starfighter game.

Cast 

 Lance Guest as Alex Rogan / Beta Alex Rogan
 Robert Preston as Centauri
 Dan O'Herlihy as Grig
 Catherine Mary Stewart as Maggie Gordon
 Norman Snow as Xur
 Kay E. Kuter as Ambassador Enduran
 Barbara Bosson as Jane Rogan
 Chris Hebert as Louis Rogan
 Dan Mason as Lord Kril
 Vernon Washington as Otis
 John O'Leary as Rylan Bursar
 George McDaniel as Kodan 1st Officer
 Charlene Nelson as Rylan Technician
 John Maio as Friendly Alien
 Al Berry as Rylan Spy
 Scott Dunlop as Tentacle Alien
 Peter Nelson as Jack Blake
 Peggy Pope as Elvira
 Meg Wyllie as Granny Gordon
 Ellen Blake as Clara Potter
 Britt Leach as Mr. Potter
 Bunny Summers as Mrs. Boone
 Owen Bush as Mr. Boone
 Marc Alaimo as Hitchhiker
 Wil Wheaton as Louis' Friend
 Cameron Dye as Andy
 Geoffrey Blake as Gary

Production 

The Last Starfighter was shot in 38 days, mostly night shoots in Canyon Country. It was one of the earliest films to make extensive use of computer graphics for its special effects. In place of physical models, 3D rendered models were used to depict space ships and many other objects. The Gunstar and other spaceships were the design of artist Ron Cobb, who also worked on Alien, Star Wars and Conan the Barbarian.

The computer graphics for the film were rendered by Digital Productions (DP) on a Cray X-MP supercomputer. The company created 27 minutes of effects for the film. This was considered an enormous amount of computer generated imagery at the time. For the 300 scenes containing computer graphics in the film, each frame of the animation contained an average of 250,000 polygons and had a resolution of 3000 × 5000 36-bit pixels. Digital Productions estimated that using computer animation required only half the time and between a third to half of the cost of traditional special effects. The result was a cost of $14 million for a film that made about $29 million at the box office.

DP used Fortran, CFT77 for programming:

Not all special effects in the film were done with computer animation. The depiction of the Beta unit before it had taken Alex's form was a practical effect, created by makeup artist Lance Anderson. The Starcar, created by Gene Winfield and driven by Centauri, was a working vehicle based on Winfield's Spinner designs from Blade Runner.

Because the test audiences responded positively to the Beta Alex character, director Nick Castle added more scenes of Beta Alex interacting with the trailer park community. Because Lance Guest had cut his hair short after initial filming had been completed and he contracted an illness during the re-shoots, his portrayal of Beta Alex in the added scenes has him wearing a wig and heavy makeup. Wil Wheaton had a few lines of dialogue that were ultimately cut from the film, but he still is visible in the background of several scenes.

Music 

Composer Craig Safan wanted to go "bigger than Star Wars" and therefore utilized a "Mahler-sized" orchestra, resulting in an unusual breadth of instruments, including "quadruple woodwinds" and "eight trumpets, [trombones], and horns!"

Reception

Critical reception
At the review aggregator website Rotten Tomatoes, The Last Starfighter received an approval rating of 76%, based on 86 reviews, with an average rating of 6.6/10. The website's critical consensus reads: "While The Last Starfighter is clearly derivative of other sci-fi franchises, its boundary-pushing visual effects and lovably plucky tone make for an appealing adventure". Metacritic gave the film a score of 67 based on 8 reviews, indicating "generally favorable reviews". Over time it has developed a cult following.

Roger Ebert gave the film two-and-a-half out of four stars. While the actors were good, particularly Preston and O'Herlihy, Ebert wrote The Last Starfighter was "not a terrifically original movie" but it was nonetheless "well-made". Colin Greenland reviewed The Last Starfighter for Imagine magazine, and stated that "apart from a mildly amusing little sub-plot with the android replica left on Earth to conceal his absence, Alex's adventure is strictly the movie of the video game: simple as can be, and pitched at a pre-teen audience who can believe Alex and Grig blasting a hundred alien ships and escaping without a scratch." Halliwell's Film Guide described the film as "a surprisingly pleasant variation on the Star Wars boom, with sharp and witty performances from two reliable character actors and some elegant gadgetry to offset the teenage mooning".

In 2017, Variety described it as having "a simple yet ingenious plot" and continued "the action is suitably fast and furious, but what makes the movie especially enjoyable are the quirky character touches given to Guest and his fellow players." Variety also noted that film critic Gene Siskel described The Last Starfighter as the best of all Star Wars imitators. Alan Jones awarded it three stars out of five for Radio Times, writing that it was a "glossy, space-age fairy tale" and "highly derivative — Star Trek-like aliens have Star Wars-inspired dog-fights against a computer-graphic backdrop — but the sensitive love story between Guest and Catherine Mary Stewart cuts through the cuteness and gives the intergalactic adventures a much-needed boost."

Adaptations 
The Last Starfighters popularity has resulted in several non-film adaptations of the storyline and uses of the name.

Musical  
A musical adaptation was first produced at the Storm Theatre Off-Off Broadway in New York City in October 2004 with music and lyrics by Skip Kennon and book by Fred Landau. In November 2005, the original cast recording was released on the Kritzerland label.

Books 
Alan Dean Foster wrote a novelization of the film shortly after it was released.

Comics 
In the same year as the release of the film, Marvel Comics published a comic book adaptation of the film by writer Bill Mantlo and artists Bret Blevins and Tony Salmons in Marvel Super Special #31. The adaptation was also available as a three issue limited series.

Games 
In 1984, FASA, a sci-fi tabletop game maker, created a gaming system The Last Starfighter: Tunnel Chase for The Last Starfighter.

Video games

Arcade 
A real The Last Starfighter arcade game by Atari, Inc. is promised in the end credits, but was never released. If released, the game would have been Atari's first 3D polygonal arcade game to use a Motorola 68000 as the CPU. Gameplay would have been taken from game scenes and space battle scenes in the film and would have included the same controller that was used on the first Star Wars arcade game. The game was abandoned once Atari representatives saw the film in post-production and decided it was not going to be a financial success.

Home computer and console 
Home versions of the game for the Atari 2600 and Atari 5200 consoles and Atari 8-bit home computers were also developed, but never commercially released under the Last Starfighter name. The home computer version was eventually renamed and released (with some minor changes) as Star Raiders II. A prototype exists for the Atari 2600 Last Starfighter game, which was in actuality a game already in development by Atari under the name Universe. This game was eventually released as Solaris.

In 1990, an NES game titled The Last Starfighter was released, but it was actually a conversion of Uridium for Commodore 64, with modified sprites, title screen and soundtrack.

A freeware playable version of the game, based on what is seen in the film, was released for PC in 2007. This is a faithful reproduction of the arcade game from the film and features full sound effects and music from the game. The creators of this game, Rogue Synapse, have also built a working arcade cabinet of the game.

Potential sequel 
In February 2008, production company GPA Entertainment added "Starfighter – The sequel to the classic motion picture Last Starfighter to its list of projects and two months later the project was reported to be "stuck in the pre-production phase". It was still there . Hollywood directors, including Seth Rogen and Steven Spielberg, as well as screenwriter Gary Whitta, have expressed interest in creating a sequel or remake, but Jonathan R. Betuel has allegedly indicated that he does not want another film made.

The rights to the film have not been clearly defined due to conflicting information. Multiple sources say Universal Pictures still owns the theatrical and home media distribution rights while Warner Bros., which absorbed Lorimar-Telepictures (Lorimar's successor) in 1992, has the international distribution rights. Another source states that Universal has the option to remake the film while Betuel has sequel rights. Further complicating the situation is a claim that both Universal and Warner Bros. each have remake and sequel rights.

In July 2015, it was reported that Betuel will write a TV reboot of the film.

On April 4, 2018, Whitta posted concept art for The Last Starfighter sequel on his Twitter account. In the same tweet he also indicated that Betuel will be collaborating with him on the project. In a follow-up interview with Gizmodo, Whitta referred to the project as "a combination of reboot and sequel that we both think honors the legacy of the original film while passing the torch to a new generation."

On October 20, 2020, Betuel stated that, with Whitta, a script for a sequel is being written and the rights to the film were recaptured.

On March 25, 2021, Whitta posted a sequel concept reel on YouTube called The Last Starfighters with concept art by Matt Allsopp and music by Chris Tilton and Craig Safan and featuring an audio clip from the original movie by Robert Preston.

See also 
 Armada - A novel by Ernest Cline with a similar premise

References

External links

 
 
 
 
 Animation Timeline from Brown University
 The Last Starfighter video game
 Arcade game specifications by Atari 
 Podcast about The Last Starfighter by the Retroist

1984 films
1980s coming-of-age films
1980s science fiction action films
American coming-of-age films
American science fiction action films
American science fiction war films
American space adventure films
American space opera films
Films about computing
Films about video games
Films adapted into comics
Films directed by Nick Castle
Films scored by Craig Safan
Films set on fictional planets
Films set on spacecraft
Films set in California
Films shot in California
Flying cars in fiction
Universal Pictures films
1980s English-language films
1980s American films